Ibrahim Artan Ismail "Haaji Bakiin" is a Somali politician. He previously served as the Minister of Security of Puntland.

Career
Nicknamed "Haaji Bakiin" (Xaaji Bakiin), Ismail hails from the autonomous Puntland region in northeastern Somalia.

He was the Chairman of the northeastern Bari province under the incumbency of former Puntland President Abdullahi Yusuf Ahmed.

In 2007, Ismail was appointed Puntland's Deputy Minister of Interior under regional President Mohamud Muse Hersi. He later served as Minister of Security of Puntland.

Besides politics, Ismail is also a prominent entrepreneur.

References

Living people
Ethnic Somali people
Somalian politicians
Somalian Muslims
Year of birth missing (living people)